X-gender is a third-gender that differs from M, for male, or F, for female. The term X-gender came into use during the later 1990s, popularized by queer organizations in Kansai, specially in Osaka and Kyoto. The term is used in place of non-binary and genderqueer in Japan, as well as on U.S. passport applications.

Prominent examples of people who define themselves as "X-gender" are mangaka Yūki Kamatani and Yuu Watase.

In 2019, Japan LGBT Research Institute Inc. conducted an online survey, collecting 348,000 valid responses from people aged 20 to 69, not all of whom were LGBT. 2.5% of the respondents called themselves X-gender.

Word origin 
The expression X-gender is made up of the X, which is used in documents in many countries for an indeterminate gender (e.g. in Austria). And gender is understood in Japan according to the meaning in English. The composition originated in Japan itself and is only used there. In contrast, the international terms "transgender", "genderqueer" or "non-binary" are hardly ever used for such gender identities in Japan.

The Kansai region on the Japanese main island is assumed to be the origin of the expression, where it appeared again and again in publications by queer (homosexual) groups in the course of the 1990s, although the exact origin is unknown. The meaning is first considered and defined in detail in an issue of Poco a poco magazine, published by G-Front Kansai in 2000, which contained several articles about people who would be classified as X-gender. However, the term itself only appeared in the glossary. Through one of the founding members of the group, who participated in several interviews and documentaries, x-jendā (pronounced ekkusu jendā in Japanese) further established. As a result, the term became more widespread through use in social media and increased awareness of the gender discourse in public opinion.

Classification 
X-gender is considered part of the transgender spectrum and is often considered a gender identity disorder. Although the term only came into use at the turn of the millennium, third gender identities have been known in Japan (such as okama or onabe) and outside for a long time (such as the Hijra in India, the Kathoey in Thailand or the Native American Two-Spirit). Since X-gender encompasses a wide variety of gender identities, there is no clear definition of this category in terms of a specific gender; three subgroups are common:

 : Individuals with characteristics of both sexes (bigender/androgyne);
 : Persons with a gender identity beyond male or female (third gender/neutral);
 : People who do not have clear sex characteristics (intersex) or do not want to be tied to one of the two gender roles (agender).

The word component  used in all of these designations means "gender" and refers to both biological and identity characteristics.

In addition there is a fourth subgroup

 : Gender identity of a person whose gender identity fluctuates between two specific genders (genderfluid)

There are multiple explanations for gender identity that can be summarized as X gender, including but not limited to the above, and variations of neutrality such as "male-leaning neutrality," neutrality with gender identity other than gender binaryness, and examples of both genders but feeling superior to one gender or the other, so even if the term is the same on the surface, there is a range in perception by the parties involved.

The meanings of "transgender" and "gender identity disorder" originally referred to the change between the two sexes man-woman: from one to the other entirely (transsexuality). Part of the ideas was also that there was only this dual gender, combined with a heteronormativity of the respective sexual orientation (opposite sex love). In contrast, Japanese X-gender offers an indefinite possibility of gender assignment outside of the two categories without questioning their binary or heteronormativity.

 People born intersex are described as XtX, and sometimes XtM and XtF, depending the gender identity

 People born female are described as FtX analogous to FtM transgender people

 People born male are described as MtX analogous to MtF transgender people

Academic research 
In a study that examined whether X-gender, which does not have either male or female identity, can be regarded as a fixed rather than diffuse or confused identity, three types of gender identity were identified based on the open-ended questionnaire that asked the respondents to describe their goals regarding their gender identity: transient, swinging, and active. The paper points out that clusters can be extracted, and that transient and aggressive types may be regarded as one fixed identity.

 They want to have a male or female identity, but at this stage they are not yet confident enough to define themselves as female or male, so they are in a transitional period where they cannot clearly define themselves as female or male.

 

 Gender identity is in flux, so the gender identity is neither male nor female.

 They are actively seeking a gender identity in which the self is not defined, and they seem to be searching for a way to be X.

On the other hand, in contrast to these classifications, there are studies that focus on the subjective experience of each individual X-gender person. For example, some people identify as X-gender because they do not want to live in the gender they were assigned at birth, but not because they prefer the other gender, or because their perceived gender changes from time to time between male and female, or neither male nor female, and they therefore identify as X They may identify as gender. It is said that these experiences lead them to identify as X-gender, but it is possible to understand X-gender as a way of understanding people in accordance with the path they have taken in their lives, which cannot be understood only by classifications.

References 
Non-binary gender
LGBT in Japan
Gender systems
Transgender in Asia